The 1924 United States presidential election in Virginia took place on November 4, 1924. Voters chose 12 representatives, or electors to the Electoral College, who voted for president and vice president.

Virginia voted for the Democratic nominee, former United States Ambassador to the United Kingdom John W. Davis, over the Republican nominee, incumbent President Calvin Coolidge. Coolidge ultimately won the national election with 54.04% of the vote.

Until 2016, this was the last presidential election where a Democrat carried Virginia without winning the presidency, and remains the last time that a Democrat who lost the popular vote has carried the state.

Results

Results by county

Notes

References

1924 Virginia elections
1924
Virginia